The 1926 Ohio State Buckeyes football team represented Ohio State University in the 1926 Big Ten Conference football season. The Buckeyes compiled a 7–1 record. Bucks outscored opponents 196–43, but suffered a devastating one-point loss to Michigan, their fifth straight loss to the Wolverines. The team was ranked No. 10 in the nation in the Dickinson System ratings released in December 1926.

Schedule

Coaching staff
 John Wilce, head coach, 14th year

References

Ohio State
Ohio State Buckeyes football seasons
Ohio State Buckeyes football